Mangelia fordii is a species of sea snail, a marine gastropod mollusk in the family Mangeliidae.

Description
The length of the shell attains  mm, its diameter  mm.

The ovate-fusiform shell is white. The shell contains 6 whorls, of which 2 smooth whorls in the protoconch. The subsequent whorls are slightly convex. This unpretending little shell has for its chief distinctive characters the 8 rounded ribs and fine spiral striation, and the outer lip is thickened within at a little distance from the acute margin. The small aperture is narrow. The columella shows a small callus. The siphonal canal is very short.

Distribution
The habitat is unknown.

References

External links
 Tucker, J.K. 2004 "Catalog of recent and fossil turrids (Mollusca: Gastropoda)". Zootaxa. 682:1-1295.

fordii
Gastropods described in 1888